Notata parva is a moth in the family Erebidae. It was described by George Hampson in 1891. It is found in India and on Sumatra, Java, Bali, Sumbawa, Borneo and the Philippines.

References

Moths described in 1891
Nudariina